Krishnakoli is a 2018 Bengali Language television Soap Opera that premiered on 18 June 2018 and airs on Bengali entertainment channel Zee Bangla. It is also available on the digital platform ZEE5. It is produced by Susanta Das of Tent Cinema and stars Tiyasha Roy and Neel Bhattacharya in the lead roles. After a wonderful journey of 3  and a half years, the show went off-air on 9 January 2022 on a happy note to make way for Pilu.

After almost a year when the show went off-air, the onscreen couple Neel Bhattacharya and Tiyasha Roy made their comeback for the second time with Star Jalsha’s Bangla Medium, which is written by Susanta Das who also wrote for Krishnakoli.

Plot
The story revolves around Shyama, a dark-skinned girl, who sets out to remove stigma attached to colour. She marries Nikhil and faces discrimination due to her complexion. A talented singer, she sets out on a journey to create an identity for herself. Shyama believes that her complexion is akin to that of Lord Krishna's. Her life changes after marriage when she goes on to make a career in music. Shyama's mother-in-law dislikes her but later in few years of time she becomes more of a daughter and allows her to sing. Then, Shyama takes part in music competition where Ashok, her brother-in-law, plans to kill her but she managed to escape. Then, she fell in a river and got missing while escaping.

After 6 months
Nikhil discovers a girl looking similar like Shyama named Amropali. After that she married Nikhil. But after some months of their marriage, Shyama returned with help of her cousin-in-law Aditya and exposed Disha-Ashok and sent them to jail. Then, Amropali become jealous and planned to kill pregnant Shyama by kidnapping. But luckily while travelling Shyama accidentally fell on a truck and went to Benaras and there Shyama gave birth a baby girl namely Krishna while Ashok mistook  Amropali to be Shyama and killed her.

After 18 years
Shyama and her daughter Krishna stay in Benaras but Shyama has lost her memory so she doesn't remember her past. Then Nikhil and his family went to Banaras and met Krishna.Later Nikhil and his family find out that Krishna's mother is Shyama. Ashok return from jail as pretending to be good and later he planned and killed his father with help of Shiva who was later revealed to be Shyama and Nikhil's son. Later Ashok was jailed. Dodo returns from foreign with his lover Shina who came to take revenge from Shyama.

Cast

Main
 Tiyasha Roy in double role as
Shyama Choudhury: Nikhil's first  wife, Krishna and Shiva's mother, Aniruddha's mother-in-law   
Amropali aka Mum: Nikhil's second wife
 Neel Bhattacharya as Nikhil Choudhury: Shyama's husband, Mum's widower, Krishna and Shiva's father, Aniruddha's father-in-law
 Soume Chatterjee as Krishna Dutta (née Choudhury): Shyama and Nikhil's daughter, Shiva's sister, Aniruddha's wife
 Raunak Dey Bhowmick as Aniruddha Dutta aka Ani: Kanika's son, Krishna's husband
 Adhiraj Ganguly as Shiva Choudhury: Shyama and Nikhil's son, Krishna's brother

Recurring
 Nibedita Mukherjee as Sujata Choudhury: Arun, Ashok and Nikhil's mother
 Shankar Chakraborty as Late Basanta Choudhury: Sujata's husband; Arun, Ashok and Nikhil's father
 Sanjib Sarkar as Krishnacharan: Shyama's father
 Mou Bhattacharya as Bishnupriya: Shyama's mother
 Koushik Bhattacharya as Arun Choudhury: Nikhil's brother; Basanta and Sujata's son; Papiya's husband; Dodo and Tatan's father
 Priyanka Halder as Papiya Choudhury: Arun's wife; Dodo and Tatan's mother
 Rimjhim Mitra as Disha Choudhury: Ashok's wife; Munni's mother
 Vivaan Ghosh as Ashok Choudhury: Nikhil's brother; Basanta and Sujata's son; Disha's husband; Munni's father
 Ananya Guha as Srijani Choudhury aka Munni: Disha and Ashok's daughter; Aniruddha's one sided lover
 Mishmee Das as Sunaina: Amropali's cousin; Nikhil's lover
 Biresh Chakraborty as Kanai: Shyama's brother; Gopal's father
 Susmita Roy Chakroborty as Parvati: Kanai's wife; Shyama's sister-in-law; Gopal's mother
 Ayush Das  as Gopal: Kanai and Parvati's son
 Sarbari Mukherjee as Rukmini: Sujata's sister; Radharani's mother; Shyama's guruma
 Sreemoyee Chattoraj as Radharani Dutta; Rukmini and Alok's daughter; Rai's mother; Aniruddha's aunt
 Sanjoy Basu as Alok: Rukmini's husband; Radharani's father; Shyama's guruji
 Purbasha Roy as Bijli: Housemaid of Choudhury family
 Arpita Mondal as Padma
 Prriyam Chakroborty as Tithi: Shyama's teacher; Disha's friend; Nikhil's love interest
 Pooja Karmakar as Priyanka Mukherjee: Nikhil's former fiancée
 Basudeb Mukherjee as Dadamoshai: Priest of Choudhury family
 Raj Bhattacharya as Romen Das: Shyama's enemy
 Rajib Bose as Aditya Choudhury: Nikhil's cousin brother; Radharani's former fiancé
 Reshmi Sen as Romen's mother
 Shobhana Bhunia as Tumpa: Bijli's sister
 Satabdi Nag / Purbasha Debnath as Shraboni
 Kushal Chakraborty as Amropali's father
 Riyanka Dasgupta as Amropali's maternal aunt
 Piyali Basu as Gouri Das: Romen's wife
 Fahim Mirza as Rony: Amropali's love interest
 Soumi Paul as Madhumita Sengupta
 Nandini Dutta as Rai Dutta: Radharani's daughter; Aniruddha's cousin sister
 Avery Singha Roy as Kanika Dutta: Radharani's sister-in-law; Aniruddha's mother
 Ranit Modak as Montu Palit
 Ashmita Baidya as Roshni: Nikhil's love interest; Amarendra's daughter
 Arindam Banerjee as Amarendra Chakraborty: Roshni's father
 Payel Dutta as Michri: Nikhil's caretaker 
 Swarnadipto Ghosh in double role as 
 Dwaipayan Chowdhury aka Dodo: Arun and Papiya's son, Tatan's brother, Shinjini's fiancé 
 Sampayan Chowdhury aka Tatan: Arun and Papiya's son, Dodo's brother, Shinjini's husband
 Dia Karmakar as Shinjini Chowdhury (née Das) aka Shina: Dodo's former lover; Tatan's wife; Romen and Gouri's daughter
 Indrajit Mazumder as Anik: Nikhil's friend; Shiva's Advocate

Reception

Ratings

Adaptations

References

External links 
 Krishnakoli at ZEE5
 

Bengali-language television programming in India
2018 Indian television series debuts
2022 Indian television series endings
Zee Bangla original programming